Derek Francis Mendl (1 August 1914 – 18 July 2001) was an Argentine first-class cricketer.

Mendl was born in the Buenos Aires suburb of Hurlingham, where his father was a grain trader. He was sent to England, along with his brother Jack Mendl, where the two were educated at Repton School. Mendl made two appearances in first-class cricket in June 1951, playing for the Free Foresters against Oxford University at Oxford, followed by an appearance for the Marylebone Cricket Club against Cambridge University at Lord's. He scored 59 runs in these two matches, with a high score of 26. He later emigrated to Australia, where he worked for Courtaulds and later for Qantas as an airline sales manager in South Africa. He died at North Ryde in Sydney in July 2001.

References

External links

1914 births
2001 deaths
Cricketers from Buenos Aires
People educated at Repton School
Argentine cricketers
Free Foresters cricketers
Marylebone Cricket Club cricketers
Argentine emigrants to Australia